1992 was a year mixed with euphoria and tragedy for Pakistan. While Pakistan won the finals of the Cricket World Cup, thousands died in the flooding that occurred in the northern regions of Pakistan as a result of torrential rains swelling the Indus river. The Nawaz government inaugurated a few projects in the province of Punjab towards the betterment of road networks and ordered a military operation in the province of Sindh to counter the growing language riots and ethnic tension.

Incumbents

Federal government 
President: Ghulam Ishaq Khan 
Prime Minister: Nawaz Sharif
Chief Justice: Muhammad Afzal Zullah

Governors
Governor of Balochistan – Gul Mohammad Khan Jogezai
Governor of Khyber Pakhtunkhwa – Amir Gulistan Janjua 
Governor of Punjab – Mian Muhammad Azhar 
Governor of Sindh – Mahmoud Haroon

Events 
 12 January – Lahore-Islamabad motorway project launched.
 22 February – Nawaz Sharif introduces yellow-cab taxi scheme.
 26 April – Pakistan's Alam Channa enters Guinness Book of World Records as the tallest man in the world.
 20 May –  A 6.0  earthquake affects northern Pakistan causing moderate damage, killing 36 and injuring 100.
 19 June – Military operation starts in Sindh.
 8 September – 1992 India–Pakistan floods, almost 1,000 people die and 3 million are evacuated due to flooding in Punjab province caused by torrential rains swelling the Indus river and its tributaries, a thousand more are also killed in the Kashmir region.
 28 September – Pakistan International Airlines Flight 268, an Airbus A300B4-203, crashes into the southern slope of the Chure Hills on approach to Tribhuvan International Airport in Kathmandu, Nepal, killing all 167 passengers and crew.

Sports

Cricket
 25 March – Pakistan defeats England by 22 runs in Melbourne in the finals of the Cricket World Cup.

Births 
 2 January – Manzoor Ahmed, footballer
 2 March – Farhan Zaman, squash player
 14 April – Mohammad Amir, cricketer
 15 April – Rabia Ashiq, athlete
 21 June – Kainat Imtiaz, cricketer 
 8 July – Raza Hasan, first-class cricketer
 9 July – Muhammad Adil, footballer
 28 September – Mawra Hocane, actress and model
 4 November – Alycia Dias, singer

Deaths 

 25 January – Mir Khalil ur Rehman.
 20 February – Muhammad Asad.
 5 March – Jam Sadiq Ali.
 17 June – Ishrat Hussain Usmani.
 8 May – Gul Mohammad.
 9 July – Mujaddid Ahmed Ijaz.
 27 October – Nayyar Sultana.

See also
Other events of 1992
Timeline of Pakistani history

References

 
1992 in Asia